Otto Steiger may refer to:

 Otto Steiger (writer) (1909–2005), Swiss writer and radio news speaker
 Otto Steiger (economist) (1938–2008), German economist and professor
 Otto Steiger (engineer) (1858–1923), Swiss engineer and designer of the Millionaire mechanical calculator

See also
 Otto
 Steiger (surname)